The official results of the Men's Marathon at the 1999 World Championships in Seville, Spain, held on Saturday August 28, 1999.

Medalists

Abbreviations
All times shown are in hours:minutes:seconds

Records

Intermediates

Final ranking

See also
 1999 World Marathon Cup
 Men's Olympic Marathon (2000)

References
 Results
 Results - World Athletics
 IAAF results
 trackandfieldnews

M
Marathons at the World Athletics Championships
1999 marathons
Men's marathons
Marathons in Spain